José Mora may refer to:

Art and culture
José de Mora (1638–1725), Spanish sculptor
José Ferrater Mora (1912–1991), Spanish philosopher
José Maria Mora (1847–1926), 19th-century Cuban born theatrical photographer

Politics
José Antonio Mora (1897–1975), Uruguayan lawyer and diplomat
José Vielma Mora (born 1964), Venezuelan politician
José Joaquín Mora Porras (1818–1860), Costa Rican politician
José María Luis Mora (1794–1850), Mexican politician

Football
José Moreno Mora (born 1981), Colombian footballer
José Francisco Mora (born 1981), Spanish footballer
José Mora (footballer, born 1975), Ecuadorian footballer
José Mora (footballer, born 1992), Costa Rican footballer